Oldboy is a 2013 American neo-noir action thriller film directed by Spike Lee and written by Mark Protosevich. It is a remake of Park Chan-wook's 2003 South Korean film of the same name, and follows a man who searches for his captors after being mysteriously imprisoned for twenty years. It stars Josh Brolin, Elizabeth Olsen, and Sharlto Copley.

Oldboy was released in the United States on November 27, 2013, by FilmDistrict. It received a mixed reception from critics, with many finding the film inferior to the classic.

Plot 
In 1993, alcoholic advertising executive Joe Doucett gets drunk after losing a major account. Before he passes out, he sees a woman with a yellow umbrella. When he wakes, he finds himself locked within a hotel room. His unseen captors provide him with food, alcohol and hygiene items, but do not explain why he is captive. Joe sees a news report that says his ex-wife Donna was raped and murdered and he is the prime suspect, while their infant daughter Mia was adopted.

Over the next 20 years, Joe quits drinking and works himself into shape, intent on escaping and getting revenge. He compiles a list of all those who would want to imprison him, and writes letters to eventually give to Mia. One day, he sees an interview with Mia, who says she would forgive her father if she ever saw him.

Joe is drugged shortly thereafter, and wakes to find himself outside with a cell phone and a small amount of money. He spots the woman with the yellow umbrella and gives chase, but ends up running into Marie Sebastian, a nurse that offers to help. He refuses but takes her business card. Joe goes to his friend Chucky, and explains what has transpired. While there, Joe gets a call on his cell phone from a man calling himself the Stranger, mocking him. Joe spends a great deal of effort to determine if any of the men on his list are the Stranger, but they all prove to be innocent. Joe collapses from dehydration, and Chucky calls Marie to help. While he recovers, Marie is taken emotionally by Joe's letters to Mia, and offers to help him further. She is able to help identify a Chinese restaurant that Joe's food came from while imprisoned.

Joe follows a delivery from the restaurant to a warehouse where he was imprisoned, and meets Chaney, its owner. Joe tortures Chaney into confessing that the Stranger arranged for his imprisonment. On return to Chucky's bar, Joe finds the Stranger there with the woman with the yellow umbrella, his bodyguard Haeng-Bok. The Stranger says they have kidnapped Mia, but if Joe can determine his identity in 46 hours, he'll let Mia free, give Joe $20 million in diamonds and proof of his innocence in Donna's murder, and even commit suicide.

Joe learns that Chaney and his men are seeking revenge by attacking Marie, and he races there, only to be captured by Chaney. Just as Chaney is about to beat him savagely, the Stranger calls Chaney and offers to pay him for Joe's release, and Chaney lets them go. Marie recognizes the ringtone from the Stranger as the theme song to Evergreen Academy, where Joe attended. At the school, they look through yearbooks; Joe recognizes one student, Adrian Doyle Pryce, and recalls tormenting his sister, Amanda, for her promiscuity, which led to the revelation that their father, Arthur, had incestuous relations with them both. As a result, Arthur moved them to Luxembourg, but later murdered his wife and Amanda, severely wounded Adrian and committed suicide. Joe calls Chucky with the name, and Chucky confirms Joe's guess that the Stranger is Adrian. When Chucky insults Amanda, Adrian, who is listening on a cloned cell phone, kills him before Joe can arrive. Joe hides Marie in a hotel for her safety, and they end up having sex, unaware Adrian is watching through hidden cameras.

Joe goes to Adrian's penthouse, defeats Haeng-Bok, and confronts Adrian. Adrian congratulates him, giving him the diamonds and escorting him to where Mia is. However, Adrian asks Joe to think why he had let Joe go in the first place, and shows that the interview with Mia was all a set-up, and "Mia" was a paid actress. Adrian shows Joe that Marie is really his daughter and that he had engineered events to this point to make Joe feel what it is like to lose everything. Adrian then fulfills his promise and commits suicide. Horrified, Joe writes Marie a letter saying they can never see each other again, and leaves her most of the diamonds, using the rest to pay Chaney to return him to the captivity of the hotel room.

Cast

 Josh Brolin as Joe Doucett
 Grey Damon as young Joe Doucett
 Elizabeth Olsen as Marie Sebastian
 Elvy Yost as "Mia Doucett"
 Sharlto Copley as Adrian Doyle Pryce / The Stranger
 Erik Gersovitz as young Adrian Pryce
 Samuel L. Jackson as Chaney
 Michael Imperioli as Chucky
 Brett Lapeyrouse as young Chucky
 James Ransone as Dr. Tom Melby
 Max Casella as James Prestley
 Linda Emond as Edwina Burke
 Pom Klementieff as Haeng-bok
 Elvis Nolasco as Cortez
 Lance Reddick as Daniel Newcombe
 Hannah Ware as Donna Hawthorne
 Richard Portnow as Bernie Sharkey
 Hannah Simone as Stephanie Lee
 Lizzy DeClement as Amanda Pryce
 Caitlin Dulany as Emma Pryce
 Cinqué Lee as Bellhop
 Steven Hauck as Arthur Pryce
 Rami Malek as Browning
 Ciera Payton as Capri

Production

Early development 
An American remake of Oldboy (2003) previously had director Justin Lin attached, with Ernesto M. Foronda and Fabian Marquez writing the screenplay after previously collaborating with Lin on Better Luck Tomorrow (2002). In November 2008, DreamWorks and Universal were securing the rights to the remake, which Will Smith had expressed interest in starring, with Steven Spielberg as director. Mark Protosevich was in talks to write the script, although the acquisition to the remake rights were not finalized. Smith later clarified that Spielberg would not be remaking the film: he would be adapting the Old Boy manga itself, which is considerably different from the film. In June 2009, the manga's publisher launched a lawsuit against the Korean film's producers for giving the film rights to Spielberg without their permission. Later in November 2009, it was reported that DreamWorks, Spielberg, and Smith had stepped back from the project. The producing team announced on November 2009 that the project was dead.

Director and casting 
On July 11, 2011, Mandate Pictures sent a press release stating that Spike Lee would direct a remake of the South Korean film (ignoring the earlier version's adaptation of the manga) with a screenplay written by Protosevich. Josh Brolin was cast to star in the remake as the lead character, while Christian Bale was reportedly in talks to portray the antagonist character, but it was later reported that Colin Firth had been offered the role. Firth later passed on the role, which was later offered to Clive Owen. In May 2012, Deadline reported that Sharlto Copley had officially been cast as the villain Adrian Pryce. Elizabeth Olsen, Samuel L. Jackson and Nate Parker were all later announced to have joined the cast. Parker was later replaced by James Ransone, due to a scheduling conflict. The film marked Jackson's first time working with director Lee since 1991's Jungle Fever.

Principal photography began in October 2012.

Final cut editing 
Spike Lee's version was 140 minutes long, but the producers heavily re-edited the film to 105 minutes (re-edits by producers also included the "one-shot hammer" scene); Lee and Josh Brolin were unhappy with it. Lee even removed his trademark "A Spike Lee Joint" credit for a more impersonal "A Spike Lee Film" during the editing process. Brolin has also said in an interview with the Los Angeles Times that he prefers Lee's version of the film, though it is not clear if this cut will ever be released.

Release

Theatrical 
Oldboy was released theatrically in the United States on November 23, 2013, by FilmDistrict. It was the last film to be distributed by the company, before Focus Features absorbed the company in October 2013. 

The film grossed $885,000 in its first five days, one of the weakest Thanksgiving openings of all time, according to Variety. It opened in 18th place at the box office and finished with a worldwide gross of $5.2 million.

Home media 
The film was released in the United States on DVD and Blu-ray on March 4, 2014, by Sony Pictures Home Entertainment.

Critical reception 
On Rotten Tomatoes, the film holds an approval rating of 39% based on 151 reviews, with an average rating of 5.1/10. The website's critical consensus reads, "Suitably grim and bloody yet disappointingly safe and shallow, Spike Lee's Oldboy remake neither surpasses the original nor adds anything new to its impressive legacy." On Metacritic, the film has a weighted average score of 49 out of 100, based on 41 critics, indicating "mixed or average reviews".

Matt Zoller Seitz of RogerEbert.com gives three of four stars, saying: "Because the Internet moves with the speed and ferocity of a hornet swarm, there's a chance that by the time you read this, Spike Lee's American remake of Oldboy will already have been stung to death. If so, too bad. This American version of Park Chan-Wook's Korean thriller is Lee's most exciting movie since Inside Man—not a masterpiece by any stretch, but a lively commercial genre picture with a hypnotic, obsessive quality, and an utter indifference to being liked, much less approved of."

Justin Chang of Variety said that "Lee and Protosevich have made a picture that, although several shades edgier than the average Hollywood thriller, feels content to shadow its predecessor's every move while falling short of its unhinged, balls-out delirium." Michael Phillips of The Chicago Tribune, in a one and a half star review noted that "The revenge in Oldboy is neither sweet nor sour; it's just drab".

Eric Kohn, in a largely positive review at Indiewire said: "It's been so long since Lee made such a thoroughly amusing work that fans should have no problem excusing its messiness. But make no mistake... Oldboy is all over the place, sometimes playing like a subdued melodrama and elsewhere erupting into flamboyance and gore."

See also 
 The Count of Monte Cristo: an 1844 novel with a similar premise, referenced briefly in the film.

Notes

References

External links 

 
 
 
 
 
 

2013 films
2013 action thriller films
2010s mystery films
American action thriller films
American mystery films
American remakes of South Korean films
Films about child sexual abuse
Films directed by Spike Lee
Films about murder
American films about revenge
Incest in film
Live-action films based on manga
Films set in 1993
Films set in 2013
Films set in New Orleans
Films shot in New Orleans
Mandate Pictures films
Universal Pictures films
40 Acres and a Mule Filmworks films
FilmDistrict films
Films produced by Roy Lee
Filicide in fiction
Films about rape
American neo-noir films
Films scored by Roque Baños
Vertigo Entertainment films
2010s English-language films
2010s American films